Malaria (Persian: مالاریا) is a 2016 Iranian drama film written and directed by Parviz Shahbazi. It world premiered in the Horizons section at the 73rd edition  of the Venice Film Festival. It later won the Grand Prix at the 2016 Warsaw International Film Festival.

The director won best director award in Dhaka International Film Festival.

Plot

Cast  
 
 Saed Soheili as Morteza (Murry)
 Saghar Ghanaat as Hanna 
 Azarakhsh Farahani as Azarakhsh (Azi) 
 Azade Namdari as Samira

References

External links 
 

2016 drama films
Iranian drama films